Pharmacology Biochemistry and Behavior is a monthly peer-reviewed scientific journal covering behavioral pharmacology. It was established in 1973 and is published by Elsevier. The editor-in-chief is Guy Griebel (Sanofi).

Abstracting and indexing 
The journal is abstracted and indexed in:

According to the Journal Citation Reports, the journal has a 2014 impact factor of 2.781.

References

External links 
 

Pharmacology journals
Publications established in 1973
Monthly journals
Elsevier academic journals
English-language journals